Emamzadeh Taher, located in Iran in the town of Karaj, is one of the most famous cemeteries in Iran.

Notable burials
Many prominent figures of Iranian literature, art and culture are interred here, including:
 Gholamhossein Banan (1911–1986) – singer
 Hassan-Ali Daftari (fa) (1910–1988) – musician
 Amir-Nasser Eftetah (de) (1935–1988) – musician
 Abdolali Vaziri (fa) (1907–1989) – singer
 Ezzat Rouhbakhsh (fa) (1908–1989) – singer
 Morteza Hannaneh (1923–1989) – composer
 Hossein Qavami (fa) (1909–1990) – singer
 Pooran (1934–1990) – singer
 Manochehr Sheybani (fa) (1924–1991) – poet
 Princess Hamdamsaltaneh Pahlavi (1903–1992) – daughter of Reza Shah Pahlavi
 Taghi Zohouri (fa) (1913–1992) – actor
 Hossein-Ali Mallah (fa) (1921–1992) – musician
 Hassan Kamkar (fa) (1923–1992) – musician
 Habibollah Badiei (fa) (1933–1992) – musician
 Ali-Asghar Zand Vakili (fa) (1941–1992) – musician
 Ahmad Ebadi (1906–1993) – musician
 Hassan Golnaraqi (fa) (1921–1993) – musician
 Shapour Niakan (fa) (1935–1993) – musician
 Parviz Narenjiha (fa) (1939–1993) – voice actor
 Ali-Asghar Bahari (1905–1995) – musician
 Ghazaleh Alizadeh (1949–1996) – poet
 Shahin Hannaneh (fa) (1943–1997) – poet
 Maziar (1952–1997) – singer
 Gholamhossein Bigdeli (1919–1998) – writer
 Mohammad Mokhtari (1942–1998) – writer
 Mohammad-Jafar Pouyandeh (1954–1998) – writer
 Ahmad Shamloo (1925–2000) – poet
 Houshang Golshiri (1938–2000) – writer
 Jafar Badiei (fa) (1915–2001) – journalist
 Safar Ghahremani (1921–2002) – political activist
 Ahmad Mahmoud (1931–2002) – writer
 Delkash (1925–2004) – singer
 Shapour Jafroudi (fa) (1928–2004) – folklore singer
 Aladin Pazargadi (fa) (1913–2004) – translator
 Nematollah Aghasi (1939–2005) – popular singer
 Mahmoud Mosharraf Azad (M. Azad) (1933–2006) – poet
 Masoud Bakhtiari (fr)  (1940–2006) – folklore singer
 Iraj Soleimani (1946–2009) – football player
 Babak Masoumi (1972–2011) – futsal player and coach
 Jalal Zolfonun (1938–2012) – musician
 Yahya Mafi (fa) (1923–2013) – writer
 Hamid-Reza Kamali (fa) (d. 2015) – racing driver

References

External links
 
 Photo gallery of the graves in Emamzadeh Taher Cemetery, Zahir od-Dowleh Cemetery Data Base, .

 
Cemeteries in Iran